|}

The Killavullan Stakes is a Group 3 flat horse race in Ireland open to two-year-old thoroughbreds. It is run at Leopardstown over a distance of 7 furlongs (1,408 metres), and it is scheduled to take place each year in late October.

History
The event was formerly named after Silken Glider, the winner of the Irish Oaks in 1957. It was run at Baldoyle in 1969, and at Phoenix Park in 1970.

The Silken Glider Stakes was restricted to fillies, and for a period it was held in mid-September. It was contested over a mile in the 1970s and 1980s, and during this period it became known as the Killavullan Stakes. The Silken Glider Stakes is the now the registered title of a race for two-year-old fillies at The Curragh.

The race was moved to late October in 1993. It was cut to 7 furlongs and opened to colts and geldings in 1995.

Records
Leading jockey since 1969 (5 wins):
 George McGrath – French Score (1969), Ballet Francais (1970), Ellette (1971), Silk Buds (1973), Dolly Dewdrop (1977)
 Christy Roche – Slow March (1978), Blue Wind (1980), Shindella (1983), Alydar's Best (1984), Lomond Blossom (1987)
 Seamie Heffernan - Shell Ginger (1996), Kincara Palace (1997), Stonemason (2001), Jupiter Pluvius (2007), Glounthaune (2021) 

Leading trainer since 1969 (14 wins):
 Aidan O'Brien – Shell Ginger (1996), Kincara Palace (1997), Monashee Mountain (1999), Perigee Moon (2000), Stonemason (2001), Footstepsinthesand (2004), Frost Giant (2005), Jupiter Pluvius (2007), Nephrite (2011), Craftsman (2013), Kenya (2017), Coral Beach (2018), Glounthaune (2021), Cairo (2022)

Winners since 1979

Earlier winners

 1969: French Score
 1970: Ballet Francais
 1971: Ellette
 1972: Daria
 1973: Silk Buds
 1974: Frances Jordan
 1975: Glanoe
 1976: Nanticious
 1977: Dolly Dewdrop
 1978: Slow March

See also
 Horse racing in Ireland
 List of Irish flat horse races

References

 Paris-Turf: 

 Racing Post:

 galopp-sieger.de – Killavullan Stakes.
 horseracingintfed.com – International Federation of Horseracing Authorities – Killavullan Stakes (2018).
 irishracinggreats.com – Killavullan Stakes (Group 3).
 pedigreequery.com – Killavullan Stakes – Leopardstown.

Flat races in Ireland
Flat horse races for two-year-olds
Leopardstown Racecourse